The Good Occupation: American Soldiers and the Hazards of Peace is a 2016 history book by Susan L. Carruthers, professor of history at Rutgers University. It deals with the occupations of Germany, Japan, Korea and Italy after World War II.

References

Books about military history
Books about World War II